Live at the Opry is a live album by American country music artist, Patsy Cline. The album was released April 4, 1988 on MCA Records and was produced by The Country Music Foundation. The album consists of transcript recordings from several appearances Cline made on the Grand Ole Opry between 1956 and 1962.

Background 
Live at the Opry is derived from transcript recordings Patsy Cline made between June 16, 1956 and March 23, 1962 on the Grand Ole Opry. The live album consists of twelve tracks of live material, which includes three of her major hits between 1957 and 1962: "Walkin' After Midnight," "I Fall to Pieces," "Crazy," and "She's Got You." According to Allmusic reviewer, Mike Henderson Cline sings a "wide variety" of songs on the album, such as Rock and Roll, Jazz, Traditional Pop, and Tin Pan Alley. Cline includes a cover version of Carl Smith's "Loose Talk" (which she had never recorded) and Hank Williams's "Lovesick Blues." The album also includes five additional songs from her years at Four Star Records, such as her debut single, "A Church, a Courtroom, and Goodbye," "There He Goes," and "How Can I Face Tomorrow."

Although originally released on a vinyl record in 1988, the album was soon available on compact disc and cassette. The cover art had originally been taken by Les Leverett and was digitally remastered by Glenn Meadows, Milan Bogdan, Jim Loyd and Benny Quinn at Masterfonics. Upon its release, the album peaked at #60 on the Billboard Magazine Top Country Albums chart.

Critical reception 

Live at the Opry garnered mixed reviews from music critics. David Handelman of Rolling Stone gave the album four out of five stars, calling the release "a flawless testament to a career that, though cut short by a plane crash, is sure to endure forever." Handelamn praised the tracks "Walkin' After Midnight" and "I Fall to Pieces," comparing Cline's vocal styles to a waitress who knows "she's pouring the world's best coffee." He further praised her overall performance, stating, "As the Country Music Foundation's Jay Orr points out in the excellent liner notes, on a few numbers Cline sounds pleasantly surprised at her own performance, letting out delighted snarls and yelps."

Live at the Opry also was given a less favorable review by Mike Henderson of Allmusic, who gave the effort three out of five stars. Henderson begins the review by explaining his criticisms, saying, "Even if Live at the Opry had been extremely disappointing, there would have been an audience for this 28-minute CD. Cline, after all, went down in history as one of country's all-time greats (despite having a much too short career), and her more obsessive fans would have welcomed the arrival of this release regardless of the quality." Henderson, however, did comment that the album was "generally rewarding," even if some of the tracks were "imperfect and brief." The reviewer finally concluded by stating, "Those with a casual interest in Cline's legacy would be better off with a collection of her best-known studio recordings, but for the seasoned Cline enthusiast, Live at the Opry has a lot to offer – imperfections and all."

Track listing

Personnel 
 Patsy Cline – lead vocals
 The Jordanaires - background vocals
 Little Jimmy Dickens – speaker, speech
 Ray Price – speech, speaking part
 Jim Reeves – speech, speaking part
 Hank Snow – speech, speaking part

Technical personnel 
 Milan Bogdan – mastering, digital transfers
 The Country Music Foundation – producer
 Jerry Joyner – design
 Les Leverett – photography
 Simon Levy – art direction
 Jim Lloyd – mastering, digital transfers
 Glenn Meadows – mastering, digital transfers
 Jay Orr – liner notes
 Ronnie Pugh – programming
 Benny Quinn – mastering, digital transfers
 Alan Stoker – original disc transfer and remastering

Charts

References 

Patsy Cline albums
1988 live albums